The West Siberian Glacial Lake, also known as West Siberian Lake or Mansiyskoe Lake, was a periglacial lake formed when the Arctic Ocean outlets for each of the Ob and Yenisei rivers were blocked by the Barents-Kara Ice Sheet during the Weichselian Glaciation, approximately 80,000 years ago. It was situated on the West Siberian Plain, and at its maximum extent the lake's surface area was more than 750,000 km2 which is more than twice that of the present-day Caspian Sea.

It is theorized that although drainage to the Arctic Ocean basin (e.g. by the Ob and Yenisei Rivers) was prevented, the lake would eventually overflow to the Mediterranean Sea through a circuitous route that would include the Aral Sea, the Caspian Sea, and the Black Sea.

See Mangerud et al. (2004) for diagrams and descriptions of the lake as well as postulated drainage patterns.

See also
 the Baikal seal, a freshwater seal of Lake Baikal probably related to Caspian seals.
 the Turgai Sea or West Siberian Sea, a Cretaceous to Eocene extension of the Tethys Sea separating Europe and Asia
 Paratethys

Notes

External links
West Siberian Lake Overview

Former lakes of Asia
Glaciology
Proglacial lakes
History of Siberia